The Girl Guides Association of Kiribati is the national Guiding organization of Kiribati. It serves 435 members (as of 2003). Founded in 1926, the girls-only organization became an associate member of the World Association of Girl Guides and Girl Scouts in 1990. The association was interrupted during World War II, as Japan seized the islands from 1941 and 1945, when it was still part of the Gilbert Islands.

References

See also
Kiribati Scout Association

World Association of Girl Guides and Girl Scouts member organizations
Scouting and Guiding in Kiribati
Youth organizations established in 1926